The 42ft Watson-class was a class of non self-righting displacement hull lifeboat built between 1954 and 1962 and operated by the Royal National Lifeboat Institution (RNLI) around the coasts of the United Kingdom and Ireland between 1954 and 1987.

History
The 42ft Watson was the final example of the medium-sized Watson type lifeboat built primarily for slipway launching at those stations where physical boathouse constraints and/or slipway strength precluded the use of the longer and heavier types. They were historically significant in being the first RNLI boats to be fitted with commercially available engines rather than the RNLI designed types previously used. The prototype, William Taylor of Oldham (ON 907) went on station at Coverack in Cornwall in July 1954 and served there until May 1972 as the final all-weather lifeboat at the station. In 1957 a version was developed suitable for beach launching. This had a widened (beam 12ft 3in) and strengthened hull to take the rigours of launching over skids.

Description
The wooden hulled 42ft Watson featured a long tapering aluminium superstructure running forward from the aft cockpit. The forward part of this, ahead of the engine room, was a survivor cabin. A major departure from previous RNLI practice was the use of commercially available engines, in the form of two Gardner 4LW 4-cylinder marine diesels producing 48bhp each. The exhaust from the engines was taken up the forward mast, as with the later 46ft 9in Watson-class boats. With the exception of the last boat, ON 967, which came four years after the previous example, all of the boats originally had open cockpits. In 1965, the first boat, ON 907, was given an enclosed wheelhouse and ON 937 followed in 1967. The others, with the exception of the  boat, had the wheelhouse enclosed in 1971. Aldeburgh's ON 946 was the only boat fitted with a mizzen mast, at the request of the crew, for a steadying sail in rough weather and was the only boat to retain an open cockpit to the end. The last boat built had an enclosed wheelhouse from the start. During the course of their service, the boats were fitted with radar and the original aerial rigging was replaced by a long pole aerial.

Fleet
ON is the RNLI's sequential Official Number.

External links
RNLI